"Let It Snow" is a song co-produced and performed by American contemporary R&B group Boyz II Men, featuring vocals from fellow American contemporary R&B singer Brian McKnight. The song was issued as the only official single from the group's holiday album Christmas Interpretations. Written by McKnight and Boyz II Men member Wanya Morris, it peaked at number 32 on the Billboard Hot 100 in 1993. It is a prequel to the song entitled "Let It Snow '98" by McKnight and themselves, from McKnight's first Christmas album Bethlehem, which was released five years later.

Music video 

The official music video for the song was directed by Lionel C. Martin.

Chart positions

References

External links 
 
 

Songs about weather
1993 songs
1993 singles
Boyz II Men songs
Brian McKnight songs
American Christmas songs
Motown singles
Music videos directed by Lionel C. Martin
Song recordings produced by Michael McCary
Song recordings produced by Nathan Morris
Song recordings produced by Shawn Stockman
Song recordings produced by Brian McKnight
Songs written by Wanya Morris
Songs written by Brian McKnight